Tereza Plíšková (born 6 February 1990 in Prague) is a Czech curler.

Teams

References

External links

Plíšková Tereza (CC SOKOL LIBOC) - Player statistics (all games with his/her participation) - Czech Curling Association

Czech national women team (2016) - Czech Curling Federation (web archive)
Kubešková returns to world stage in Saint John - Curling Canada – 2014 Ford World Women's Curling Championship
Video: 

Living people
1990 births
Sportspeople from Prague
Czech female curlers
Czech curling champions